Gandhi Memorial Science College, commonly known as G.G.M. Science College, formerly Prince of Wales College, established in 1905 is an NAAC accredited "A" grade college  located in the city of Jammu, in Jammu and Kashmir, India. The college's undergraduate program provides Bachelor of Science degrees in various subject combinations, which are three-year programs. The school also offers postgraduate education degrees in English and Geology, Bachelor of Computer Application degrees, and certificate courses in the areas of computer applications, web designing and industrial electronics.

Departments
The following are departments of the college.

 Biotechnology
 Botany
 Chemistry
 Computers
 Electronics
 English
 Geography
 Geology
 Library science
 Mathematics
 Physical Education
 Physics
 Zoology

Heritage status
In July 2015, the college was designated as "heritage status" by the University Grants Commission (UGC) of India, which serves to enable funds for school upgrades and improvements.

Gandhi Memorial Science College Ground

The Gandhi Memorial Science College Ground is a playing ground located at the Govt. Gandhi Memorial Science College. The ground hosts matches for Jammu & Kashmir cricket team. The hosted his first match in 1976 between Jammu & Kashmir cricket team and Punjab cricket team. Until December 2013, the ground hosted 18 first-class matches.

References

External links
 

Universities and colleges in Jammu and Kashmir
Education in Jammu (city)
Cricket grounds in Jammu and Kashmir
Sports venues in Jammu and Kashmir
Buildings and structures in Jammu (city)
Sport in Jammu and Kashmir
Educational institutions established in 1905
1905 establishments in India